Chronopost International, a member of the La Poste group, provides express shipping and delivery service both domestically (in France) and internationally.

Domestic services comprise mostly next-day services, with some variation depending on the exact delivery locations, for packages and documents weighing up to 30 kilograms (66 lb).

International services vary much more by location, due to the increased distance between origin and destination and lack of a substantial distribution system at the destination. As is the case with domestic shipments, most services provide delivery for items weighing no more than 30 kg.

The Chrono Mission product line, available for both domestic and international shipments, provides for the delivery of items weighing up to 1.4 tonnes (3080 lb) and up to 14 m3 (490 ft³) in size.

Chronopost has international offices in Morocco and Ivory Coast.

For some of the delivery of packages in the United States, Chronopost express packages are delivered by FedEx as International Priority.

References

External links
 International landing page for Chronopost
 Chronopost's product range in English

Logistics companies of France